Lorna Piatti-Farnell (born 1980) is an academic in New Zealand who researches popular media and cultural history. She is professor of film and popular culture at Auckland University of Technology (AUT).

Academic career 
Lorna Piatti-Farnell was born in 1980. She was educated at Loughborough University, Leicestershire, graduating in 2009 with a PhD. She was employed by De Montfort University and  Bishop Grosseteste University prior to moving to New Zealand where she joined AUT in 2010, being promoted to full professor, effective 1 January 2020.

Piatti-Farnell founded the Gothic Association of New Zealand and Australia (GANZA) in 2014 and is its president. The organisation facilitates interdisciplinary sharing of all aspect of Gothic culture.

Selected works

Books

Articles

References 

1980 births
Living people
Alumni of Loughborough University
Academic staff of the Auckland University of Technology